Piran is a Kurdish tribe located in Iran, but also Iraq, Afghanistan, and Turkmenistan.

History
The Piran tribe has an ancient history. Part of the Piran tribe migrated to modern-day Afghanistan, Turkmenistan, and Iranian Khorasan during the transfer of Kurds from Western Iran and eastern Iraq during the Safavid period to defend against Uzbek and Mongol invasions. The Piran tribe lives in Piranlu, Piranshahr, Sarpol-e Zahab, Kermanshah, Dehloran, and Ilam in Iran, and Amarah in southern Iraq. The Piran tribe speaks various Kurdish dialects depending on area, and they follow Islam.

See also
Kurdish tribes

References
 

Kurdish tribes
Iranian Kurdistan
Iraqi Kurdistan